The Christmas Album, Volume II is the twenty-second studio album by Neil Diamond, and his second to feature Christmas music.  It was produced by Peter Asher and released by Columbia Records in 1994, only two years after Diamond's previous Christmas album. It features orchestral and choir arrangements by David Campbell, who also worked on the first Christmas album, as well as several of Diamond's other works.  The album reached number 9 on the Billboard Holiday Album chart and was certified as gold by the RIAA on December 6, 1994.

Track listing

Personnel 
 Neil Diamond – lead vocals
 Robbie Buchanan – acoustic piano (1, 12), keyboards (11, 13, 15), percussion (13), harmonium (14)
 Bill Payne – Hammond B3 organ (4, 7)
 Tom Hensley – acoustic piano (5, 6), arrangements (5, 6), horn section conductor (5, 6)
 Alan Lindgren – arrangements (5, 6, 9), horn section conductor (5, 6), piano (9)
 Brian Mann – accordion (10)
 Bob Mann – guitar (1, 2, 4, 5, 7, 8, 11), acoustic guitar (10)
 Waddy Wachtel – guitar (1, 4, 7), acoustic guitar (10)
 Kenny Blackwell – mandolin (10)
 Michael Thompson – guitar (15)
 Jimmy Johnson – bass guitar (1, 4, 7, 15)
 Bob Magnusson – bass guitar (2, 5, 6, 8, 10)
 Carlos Vega – drums (1, 4-7, 15), percussion (7)
 Peter Asher – percussion (2, 7, 8, 11)
 Vince Charles – steel drums (2)
 Alan Estes – marimba (5), vibraphone (6)
 M.B. Gordy – vibraphone (8), percussion (13, 14), timpani (15)
 Jon Clarke – woodwinds (2), flute (14), recorders (14)
 Tommy Morgan – harmonica (6)
 Carl Smith – lute (14)
 David Campbell – arrangements (1-4, 7, 8, 10-15), brass conductor (1), horn section conductor (4, 7), orchestra conductor (5, 6, 8, 9, 11-15), choir conductor for Ambrosian Singers (9, 11-15)
 Walter Whitman – arrangements (1), brass conductor (1), choir conductor (1)
 The Soul Children of Chicago – choir (1)
 139th Street Quartet – barbershop choir (3)
 The Ambrosian Singers – choir (9, 11-15)
 John McCarthy – choirmaster for Ambrosian Singers
 The Angel Voices – boys choir (9, 11, 13, 14)
 Robert Prizeman – choir conductor for Angel Voices 
 Raven Kane – vocal contractor
 Backing vocals – Valerie Carter (2), Laura Satterfield (2), Kate Markowitz (2, 4, 7), Raven Kane (4, 7), Stephanie Spruill (4, 7), Julia Waters (4, 7), Maxine Waters (4, 7), Oren Waters (4, 7), Wendy Fraser (7), Andrea Robinson (7), Herb Pedersen (10)
 Children’s backing vocals (7) – Victoria Asher, Perrie Briskin, Anjuli Cain, Alyssa Campbell, Erika Christensen, Milena Ferreria, Kelyn Huppard, Jacob King, Evan Payne, Ashley Powell and Sara Seider

Production 
 Producer – Peter Asher
 Production Coordinator – Ivy Skoff
 Recorded and Mixed by Frank Wolf
 Additional Engineers – Bernie Becker and Julie Last
 Assistant Engineers – Kristin Cowie, Sean O’Dwyer, John Radzin and Marnie Riley.
 Recorded at Arch Angel Studios (Los Angeles, CA), Conway Studios (Hollywood, CA) and Angel Recording Studios (London, England).
 Mastered by Doug Sax at The Mastering Lab (Hollywood, CA).
 Art Direction – David Kirschner
 Design – Gabrielle Raumberger and Dylan Tran
 Photography – Mauro Carerro
 Background Photography – David Skernick

See also
The Christmas Album

References

Neil Diamond albums
1994 albums
Albums produced by Peter Asher
Columbia Records Christmas albums
Christmas albums by American artists
Pop Christmas albums